Clara Edwards (originally Bertha Edwards, Bertha Johnson and then Clara Johnson) is a fictional character on the American television sitcom The Andy Griffith Show (1960 – 1968). Clara was portrayed by actress Hope Summers.

See also
 Aunt Bee
 Hope Summers

References
 The Andy Griffith Show: The Complete Series. Paramount, 2007.
 Beck, Ken, and Clark, Jim. The Andy Griffith Show Book. St. Martin's Griffin, 2000.
 Kelly, Richard. The Andy Griffith Show. Blair, 1984.

The Andy Griffith Show characters
Fictional characters from North Carolina